Unstoppable (marketed as Unstoppable with NBK) is an Indian Telugu-language web television talk show hosted by Nandamuri Balakrishna that premiered on 4 November 2021 on the streaming platform Aha. The first season became the most watched show on Aha with over 40 crore (400 million) streaming minutes. It has also became the top rated talk show in India on IMDb. Second season was premiered on 14 October 2022.

Production 
In early October 2021, Nandamuri Balakrishna was approached by Aha for a talk show under the direction of Krish Jagarlamudi. Filming began in Annapurna Studios with Balakrishna being injured during the shoot. The show was formally announced in later October with 4 November 2021 as its premier date. Prasanth Varma was hired to shoot the promotional teasers for the show. The anthem song of the second season was sung by Roll Rida and composed by Mahati Swara Sagar. Filming of the first episode featuring N. Chandrababu Naidu, was completed on 4 October 2022. An episode featuring Pawan Kalyan was shot on 27 December 2022.

Episodes

Season 1

Season 2

Reception 
Reviewing the first episode of second season, 123Telugu stated that "first episode of Unstoppable 2 is more serious than fun".

References

External links 

 

2021 web series debuts
2021 Indian television series debuts
Indian television talk shows
Aha (streaming service) original programming
Telugu-language web series
2022 Indian television seasons
2021 Indian television seasons
2023 Indian television seasons